World Series of Poker: Pro Challenge is a poker game (texas hold 'em) by Glu Mobile for mobile phones and the N-Gage 2.0 platform.

Features 
 Face up against some of the biggest names in poker including Johnny Chan, Michael Mizrachi, Annie Duke, and Shannon Elizabeth
 A first person perspective lets you observer your opponent's facial expressions
 Playing the cards right might fill up your opponents' "Tilt Meter" - damaging their good judgments as they psyche out
 Earning "Signature Chips" achievements as proof of your progress

Development 
World Series of Poker: Pro Challenge is developed by Glu Mobile and was first made available as a Java game in late June 2007. The game was then re-released on February 7, 2008, as part of the new N-Gage 2.0 platform.

Screenshots

External links
 Official website
 N-Gage official website
 Game data at N-Gage.com

2007 video games
Poker video games
Mobile games
N-Gage service games
Java platform games
Video games developed in the United States
Glu Mobile games
Single-player video games